The year 1725 in architecture involved some significant events.

Buildings and structures

Buildings

 Peterhof Palace near Saint Petersburg is completed.
 St George's, Hanover Square, London, designed by John James, is completed for the Commission for Building Fifty New Churches.
 Hôpital civil, Strasbourg, completed

Births
 Matthew Brettingham the Younger, English architect (died 1803)
 François Dominique Barreau de Chefdeville, French architect (died 1765)
 Approximate date – James Bridges, English architect working in Bristol

Deaths
 March 2 – José Benito de Churriguera, Spanish architect and sculptor (born 1665)

References 

architecture
Years in architecture
18th-century architecture